Jean Lacouture (9 June 1921 – 16 July 2015) was a journalist, historian and author.  He was particularly famous for his biographies.

Career 
Jean Lacouture was born in Bordeaux, France. He began his career in journalism in 1950 in Combat as diplomatic editor. He joined Le Monde in 1951. In 1953, he worked in Cairo for France Soir, before returning to Le Monde as director for the overseas services, and grand reporter (one of the highest titles in French journalism) until 1975.

Politically engaged on the Left, Lacouture supported decolonisation, and Mitterrand from 1981. He worked for the Nouvel Observateur, and L'Histoire. He is interviewed in the 1968 documentary film about the Vietnam War entitled In the Year of the Pig.

Lacouture was also director for publication at Seuil, one of the main French publishers, from 1961 to 1982, and professor at the L'Institut d'Etudes Politiques de Paris (Sciences PO) between 1969 and 1972.

He was mainly known to the public because of his biographies, including the lives of Ho Chi Minh, Nasser, Léon Blum, De Gaulle, François Mauriac, Pierre Mendès France, Mitterrand, Montesquieu, Montaigne, Malraux, Germaine Tillion, Champollion, Jacques Rivière, Stendhal and Kennedy.

A dedicated music lover, Lacouture was also president of a society of devotees of Georges Bizet. In 2015 he died in Roussillon, France.

Works 

 Jesuits: A Multibiography 
 De Gaulle
 De Gaulle: The Rebel 1890–1944 
 De Gaulle: The Ruler 1945–1970 
 Robert Capa 
 Ho Chi Minh: A Political Biography. 
 Vietnam: Between two truces ASIN B0006D759K
 Montaigne à Cavalo 
 Pierre Mendes France 
 The demigods: Charismatic leadership in the third world 
 Nasser: A biography 
 Léon Blum 
 J.F. Kennedy 
 "l’Égypte en mouvement"

References 

Writers from Bordeaux
1921 births
2015 deaths
20th-century French writers
20th-century French historians
20th-century French journalists
French biographers
French war correspondents
People of the Algerian War
Prix Goncourt de la Biographie winners
Grand Officiers of the Légion d'honneur
Commandeurs of the Ordre des Arts et des Lettres
20th-century French male writers
French male non-fiction writers
French expatriates in Egypt